Tachigali is a flowering plant genus in the legume family (Fabaceae) that contains 54 species.

Species include:
 Tachigali multijuga Benth. (= T. paratyensis (Vell.) H.C. Lima)
 Tachigali myrmecophila
 Tachigali paniculata Aubl. – Carvoeiro
 Tachigali paraensis (Huber) Barneby
 Tachigali tessmannii
 Tachigali versicolor Standl. & L.O.Williams – "suicide tree"

References

Further reading

Fabaceae genera
Caesalpinioideae
Taxonomy articles created by Polbot